The Velvet Queen (French: La Panthère des neiges) is a 2021 French-language documentary film. It follows Sylvain Tesson and Vincent Munier as they attempt to find a snow leopard in Tibet. It won Best Documentary Film at the 47th César Awards, and Best Documentary at the 27th Lumières Awards. The film received positive reviews from critics, with particular praise for its musical score and cinematography.

Reception 

On Rotten Tomatoes, the film has an approval rating of 100% based on 46 reviews and an average rating of 8/10. The site's critical consensus reads, "Its narration might not be distracting for some, but The Velvet Queen more than makes up for it with some truly striking cinematography." Metacritic, which uses a weighted average, assigned a score of 78 out of 100 based on 10 critics, indicating "generally favourable reviews".

Brian Tallerico of RogerEbert.com described the film as "a calming, meditative experience." Paul Byrnes of The Sydney Morning Herald rated the film 4 out of 5 stars, calling it "transcendently beautiful." Peter Bradshaw of The Guardian also rated the film 4 out of 5, stating that "the film has a real writer whose style rises above the cliche into which nature documentary almost always descends."

Soundtrack 

The soundtrack for the film was created by Nick Cave and Warren Ellis, and released on 17 December 2021 by Lakeshore Records. Siobhán Kane of The Irish Times rated the soundtrack 4 out of 5 stars, calling it "naturally wonderful". Lucy Harbron of Clash rated it 7/10, commenting that the soundtrack "feels like an essential part of the Nick Cave and Warren Ellis discography."

Accolades

References

External links 
 

2021 documentary films
2020s French-language films
French documentary films